Åknes is a village in Andøy Municipality in Nordland county, Norway. The village is located on the southwestern part of the island of Andøya, along the Gavlfjorden.

References

Andøy
Villages in Nordland